Suid gammaherpesvirus 4 (SuHV-4) is a species of virus in the genus Macavirus, subfamily Gammaherpesvirinae, family Herpesviridae, and order Herpesvirales.

References 

Gammaherpesvirinae